April Waters is an Oregon painter best known for landscape paintings focusing on water and large scale portraits.  She has presented her work at forums on water and climate issues with scientists, government officials, and the public. Her series "Sheroes" portrays women who are advocates of humanitarian and environmental justice by taking stands to protect people and resources.

Early life and education
Born in 1954, Waters earned a BFA degree at the University of Colorado, Boulder. She also studied at the Art Center School of Design, Los Angeles,  at UCLA, and California State University, Fullerton.

Waters is married to Architect, Nathan Good. They have a three children, Forrest Good, Diana Good-Long and Aaron Good.

Career 

April Waters is an Oregon artist whose work has focused on rivers, creeks, estuaries, and oceans, leading to regional and national acclaim through her exhibits and collaboration with scientists and universities. Salem Magazine described her process, "When she is inspired by a place, she goes there often, in different seasons and on different times of the day. In most cases, she sketches or paints on site. Sometimes, she hires a helicopter pilot to fly her over the site to see what it is like from above. Equipped with sketches and her experiences, she then paints in her studio using oil on canvas or oil on panel."

Her works are held in public and private collections in Oregon and California, such as Oregon State University, Salem Hospital, Edward C. Allworth Veterans' Home, Mount Angel Abbey, Slocum Orthopedic Center and Riverbend Peace Health Hospital in Springfield, Oregon, as well as internationally. Waters' work was exhibited at the U.S. Embassy in Bishkek, Kyrgyzstan from 2012-2015 through the United States Arts in Embassies Program.

She was the artist in residence at the 2017 American Water Resources Association's annual conference, which said, "With its qualities of reflection, transparency and movement water has been the focus of April's paintings for decades." The Statesman Journal said, "A river is a natural subject for Waters. Many of her paintings are focused on area rivers, creeks, estuaries, and coastlines and exhibited in hospitals, clinics, and other health-related facilities."

Her series of portraits, "Sheroes", was described at its opening at the Pacific Northwest College of Art as consisting "...of seven large-scale portraits of larger-than-life women. The paintings of Vandana Shiva, Wangari Maathai, Malalai Joya, Helen Caldicott, Amy Goodman, Cindy Sheehan and Maude Barlow are of women who have bravely raised the flame for humanitarian and environmental justice."

Critical reception
Bob Hicks of Oregon Arts Watch wrote, "What might seem at first glance simply a well-rendered landscape is certainly that, but also more: It is an examination of waterways, their shifting patterns, their effect on humans and the way we live our lives, the precarious ecological balances of a world in climate upheaval. There is something, not clinical, but deeply observational about her interpretations of the natural world and the way things work."

Awards 
In 2018, Waters was sponsored by the National Science Foundation for "deployment to Palmer Station, Antarctica ...[for] the opportunity to observe, sketch. and produce study-paintings of the ocean, sea ice, icebergs, and glaciers around the station. The focus on water is intended to bring a fresh and unique perspective to observe and express the Antarctic wilderness. Her goal is to communicate the beauty as well as the vulnerability of Antarctica's ecosystem and help communicate the region's sense of wonder to the public. Her unique perspective will provide a distinctive addition to the Antarctic Artists and Writers portfolio."

Waters was National Park Artist in Residence for the Crater Lake Centennial Celebration and exhibition at the Schneider Museum of Art in Ashland. In July, 2022, she was an Artist in Residence at the Ilulissat Art Museum in Ilulissat, Greenland.

References

External links
 

20th-century American women artists
21st-century American women artists
Living people
Year of birth missing (living people)